Pieter de Zeelander (nickname Kaper) (c. 1620 in Haarlem – after 1650 in Rome) was a Dutch painter who specialized in seascapes.

Biography
Nothing is known about his training. He traveled to Rome in 1648.  He was a member of the Bentvueghels, an association of mainly Dutch and Flemish artists working in Rome.  He was given the nickname (called ‘bent name’) 'Kaper', which means privateer.  There is no further information known about him and it is believed that he died in Rome.

References

1620s births
1650s deaths
Artists from Haarlem
Dutch Golden Age painters
Dutch male painters
Dutch marine artists
Members of the Bentvueghels